Maitland is a suburban city in Orange County, Florida, United States, part of the Greater Orlando area. The population was 19,543 at the 2020 census. The area's history is exhibited at the Maitland Historical Museum; the city also hosts the Maitland Art Center, as well as notable examples of Mayan Revival architecture and Fantasy architecture, the Maitland Telephone Museum, and the William H. Waterhouse House Museum (all museums and the Maitland Art Center are now managed by Art & History Museums of Maitland). A SunRail station is located in Maitland on Highway 17-92. The city is named for Fort Maitland.

History

Maitland is one of the oldest incorporated suburban municipalities in central Florida. The area was previously inhabited by Timucuan Native Americans. The town was originally named for a nearby Lake, which honored Captain William Seton Maitland, who fought in the Second Seminole Indian War, and was slain in the battle of Wahoo Swamp. A small military outpost was built in 1838 on the western shore of Lake Fumecheliga (later Lake Maitland) during the Second Seminole War. After the Civil War, new residents arrived in the area. Christopher Columbus Beasley, perhaps the first permanent settler, arrived at Lake Maitland in 1871. A post office opened on January 2 of the next year and operated in his home. Around this post office, a small town grew. In the closing decades of the nineteenth century the area was put into extensive citrus production.

Lake Maitland was incorporated as a town in 1885, the third such town in Orange County to do so. In its infancy, Lake Maitland was often characterized as a rural village, with streets lined with large oak trees planted by early town aldermen. However, the old town began to rapidly modernize as Orlando's suburban sprawl reached the town in the mid 1920s.

During this period the town grew rapidly as new houses and roads were built. In 1959, Maitland was incorporated as a city.

Maitland is a suburb of Orlando. The town's "historical corridor" encompasses old residences still standing and occupied in the Lake Lily-Lake Catherine area and extending through the central portion of the city. Examples of these century-old structures include the "Church of the Good Shepherd" (1883); the "William H. Waterhouse House" (1884); the Maitland Public Library (1907); and the "Maitland Art Center" (1937). The area has always been a vacation spot because of its climate, location to theme parks and people. Maitland has many picturesque parks along lakes, which attract many boaters.

Geography

Maitland is located at  (28.626926, −81.366961).

The city of Maitland has a total of 21 lakes, the largest being Lake Maitland (451 acres).

Demographics

As of the census of 2020, there were 19,543 people, 7,510 households, and 4,422 families residing in the city.

The racial makeup of the city was 73.6% White, 14.5% African American, 0.9% Native American, 4.5% Asian, 0.0% Pacific Islander, 2.9% from other races and 3.7% from two or more races. Hispanic or Latino of any race were 14.3% of the population.

There were 7,510 households, out of which 22.1% had children under the age of 18 living with them, 44.6% were married couples living together, 10.5% had a female householder with no husband present, and 41.1% were non-families. 30.3% of all households were made up of individuals, and 7.8% had someone living alone who was 65 years of age or older. The average household size was 2.34 and the average family size was 2.93.

In the city, the population was spread out, with 23.7% under the age of 18, 4.8% from 18 to 24, 40.8% from 25 to 44, 21.3% from 45 to 64, and 9.4% who were 65 years of age or older. The median age was 36.6 years. For every 100 females, there were 88 males. For every 100 females age 18 and over, there were 84.1 males.

The median income for a household in the city was $79,821, and the median income for a family was $100,978. Males had a median income of $53,542 versus $30,256 for females. The per capita income for the city was $49,378. About 8.7% of families and 10.1% of the population were below the poverty line, including 12.4% of those under age 18 and 5.1% of those age 65 or over.

Economy

The Maitland Center was established in 1982 adjacent to Interstate 4. Today its  include over 400 businesses and over 45 office buildings.

Worldwide Brands has its headquarters in Maitland.

Other local employers include:
 EA Tiburon, makers of the popular Madden NFL series and NCAA Football series video games
 Sonny's Real Pit Bar-B-Q
 Fidelity Integrated Financial Solutions
 Charles Schwab Corporation
 The Timothy Plan, a Christian-oriented investing firm.

SunRail, the regional commuter rail service, operates a passenger rail station in Maitland. The first  segment of the system (between DeBary and Sand Lake Road in Orange County) began operations on May 1, 2014.

Culture and recreation

Maitland is home to the nationally recognized and Central Florida's only full-time independent movie theater, Enzian Theater, in turn home to the Florida Film Festival. Maitland is also home to the Art & History Museums – Maitland, including the Maitland Art Center (formerly the Research Studio, 1937), which is a designated a National Historic Landmark (2014) for its unique Mayan Revival and Fantasy architecture; the Maitland Historical Museum; the Maitland Telephone Museum; the William H. Waterhouse House Museum, also listed on the National Register of Historic Places; and the Carpentry Shop Museum. Maitland is also home to The Roth Family Jewish Community Center of Greater Orlando, which serves as the center of Jewish life in Orlando and welcomes people of all backgrounds.

In August 2005 the Maitland Little League team made it to the semifinals of the 2005 Little League World Series.

Notable people

 Dante Bichette, former MLB player
 Chip Caray, TBS's lead play-by-play announcer for the Atlanta Braves and the number two play-by-play man for college football on WTBS
 Jazzy Danziger, winner of the Brittingham Prize in Poetry
 Jan Fortune, former state representative
 Buddy Morrow, leader of the Tommy Dorsey Orchestra
 Michael James Nelson, television actor, writer, producer
 John M. Pierce, writer on and promoter of amateur telescope making
 J. Andre Smith, artist and architect; founder of the Research Studio (now known as the Maitland Art Center)
 Mike Stanley, former MLB player

Education

Orange County Public Schools operates public schools in Maitland.
 Dommerich Elementary School
 Lake Sybelia Elementary School
 Maitland Middle School

Private schools include:
 Maitland Montessori School
 Jewish Academy of Orlando
 Orangewood Christian School
 Park Maitland School
 King of Kings Lutheran School (K3–8) 

Institutions of higher education include:
 Everglades University
 University of Phoenix-Orlando

Museums and libraries

 Maitland Historical Museum
 Maitland Public Library
 Telephone Museum
 Waterhouse Carpentry Museum

Points of interest

 Maitland Art Center
 Enzian Theater
 Lake Maitland
 RDV Sportsplex
 William H. Waterhouse House
 Jewish Community Center of Greater Orlando
 Holocaust Memorial Resource and Education Center of Florida
 Audubon Center for Birds of Prey
 Howell Branch Nature Preserve and Park
 Lake Lily – Location for the Maitland Art Festival
 Lake Minnehaha
 Lake Sybelia
 Maitland Community Park
 Maitland Farmer's Market
 Quinn Strong Park

References

External links

 City of Maitland official website
 Maitland Public Library
 Art & History Museums - Maitland

 
Cities in Orange County, Florida
Cities in Florida